The 1941 All-Ireland Minor Football Championship was the 13th staging of the All-Ireland Minor Football Championship, the Gaelic Athletic Association's premier inter-county Gaelic football tournament for boys under the age of 18. As a result of the Emergency it was the last championship to be staged until 1945.

Louth entered the championship as defending champions.

Roscommon won the championship following a 3-6 to 0-7 defeat of Louth in the All-Ireland final. This was their second All-Ireland title and their first in two championship seasons.

Results

Connacht Minor Football Championship

Leinster Minor Football Championship

Munster Minor Football Championship

Ulster Minor Football Championship

All-Ireland Minor Football Championship
Semi-Finals

Final
| 1941
| Roscommon
| 3–06
| Louth
| 0–07

References

1941
All-Ireland Minor Football Championship